Bupropion/zonisamide (former tentative brand name Empatic, Excalia) is an experimental combination of bupropion which was under development for the treatment of obesity. Bupropion is a norepinephrine–dopamine reuptake inhibitor and nicotinic acetylcholine receptor antagonist, while zonisamide is an anticonvulsant acting as a sodium channel blocker, T-type calcium channel blocker, and weak carbonic anhydrase inhibitor. The combination was being developed by Orexigen Therapeutics and reached phase II clinical trials prior to discontinuation.

See also
 Naltrexone/bupropion

References

Abandoned drugs
Anorectics
Antiobesity drugs
Calcium channel blockers
Carbonic anhydrase inhibitors
Combination drugs
Norepinephrine releasing agents
Norepinephrine reuptake inhibitors
Nicotinic antagonists
Sodium channel blockers